Broadway Historic District may refer to:

 Broadway Historic District (Rock Island, Illinois), listed on the National Register of Historic Places (NRHP)
 Broadway Historic District (Bangor, Maine), NRHP-listed
 Broadway Historic District (Salem, New Jersey), NRHP-listed
 Broadway Historic District (Cape Vincent, New York), NRHP-listed
 Broadway Historic District (Lancaster, New York), NRHP-listed
 Broadway Historic District (Monticello, New York), NRHP-listed
 Broadway Historic District (Saratoga Springs, New York), NRHP-listed
 Broadway Historic District (Nashville, Tennessee), NRHP-listed in Davidson County, Tennessee

See also
Broadway Avenue Historic District (disambiguation)
Broadway Historic Theatre District, New York City
North Broadway Street Historic District, De Pere, Wisconsin, NRHP-listed
Broadway-Dousman Historic District, Green Bay, Wisconsin, NRHP-listed
Broadway-Walnut Historic District, Green Bay, Wisconsin, NRHP-listed